Roderick A. Maude-Roxby (born 2 April 1930) is a retired English actor. He has appeared in numerous films, such as Walt Disney's The Aristocats, where he voiced the greedy butler Edgar Balthazar (his only voice role); Unconditional Love; and Clint Eastwood's White Hunter Black Heart, playing Thompson.

An early innovator at the Royal College of Art, RCA, alongside David Hockney and Peter Blake, he was one of the UK's first performance artists, before it was a recognized art form. At the RCA he edited ARK magazine in 1958 and was president of the college's Theatre Group. He had a joint exhibition with Blake at the Portal Gallery in 1960. He also collaborated in a pre-Monty Python series with Michael Palin and Terry Jones, called The Complete and Utter History of Britain. He also made theatrical and television appearances in, among other shows, The Goodies, Rowan and Martin's Laugh In, Not Only... But Also and  The Establishment. He won the Theatre of the Year Award for Best Comic New York in 1968 for his work as a stand-up comedian.

Maude-Roxby has also worked with masks and improvisation for over 40 years and was a co-creator of improvisational games developed at the Royal Court Theatre, and then as "Theatre Machine" with Keith Johnstone. In 1992 Maude-Roxby starred as imprisoned alien Mercantor in the experimental BBC1 Saturday morning children's magazine show Parallel 9.

Filmography

References

External links
 
 

1930 births
Living people
20th-century English male actors
21st-century English male actors
Male actors from London
English male film actors
English male television actors
English male voice actors
English performance artists
Alumni of the Royal College of Art